Punta Baja Airport  is an airstrip on the shore of General Carrera Lake in the Aysén Region of Chile.

There is rising terrain west of the runway. Southeast approach and departures are over the water.

See also

Transport in Chile
List of airports in Chile

References

External links
OpenStreetMap - Punta Baja
OurAirports - Punta Baja
SkyVector - Punta Baja
FallingRain - Punta Baja Airport

Airports in Chile
Airports in Aysén Region